Waking Up with the House on Fire is the third album by the English new wave group Culture Club, released on 22 October 1984. The album peaked at number two on the UK Albums Chart, becoming the band's third top five album.

Overview
The first single, "The War Song", became a number two hit in the UK and a top 20 hit in the US in late 1984. However, the album did not achieve the level of success expected. While Waking Up with the House on Fire reached Platinum status in both the UK and the US, it was considered to be a disappointment compared to the success of the group's previous album, Colour by Numbers (1983). It sold approximately five million copies worldwide, being certified gold or platinum in many countries, and earning Double Platinum status in Canada.

The other two singles were "The Medal Song" (UK No. 32), (with its B-side, "Don't Go Down That Street" being released as a single from a subsequent EP in Japan but only reaching No. 69 in the charts) and "Mistake No. 3" (US No. 33). In Mexico, "Don't Talk About It" was released as a single in mid 1985 and charted at number eight.

Billboard called "Mistake No. 3" "slow, lyrical musings on human weakness" that is "an unusually sad song" for Culture Club.

On the VH1 program Behind the Music, the narrator states, "Today, the band admits the album was a hurried and halfhearted effort."  Some music insiders also feel that Culture Club and lead singer Boy George may have fallen victim to overexposure in both the British and American press by the end of 1984. Subsequently, Culture Club decided to change direction for the next album, From Luxury to Heartache (1986), by choosing a new producer in Arif Mardin and moving in a dance-oriented direction.

In 2008, the album was re-released in Japan, as a special collector "mini-LP" edition (a CD in a cardboard sleeve (featuring booklets) as a miniature version of the original vinyl album).

The album's cover can be seen in the 2008 film Sex and the City as part of Carrie Bradshaw's collection of LPs from the 1980s.

Reception

Reviews for Waking Up with the House on Fire have been fairly negative. In Smash Hits magazine, reviewer Tom Hibbert stated the album was "a disaster of mediocrity" and that the majority of the tracks were "a characterless stodge of bland blue-eyed soul, slouching rhythms, pedestrian horns and nonchalant vocals...". 

AllMusic's Lindsay Planer retrospectively rated the album two out of five stars. He noted that "overexposure in the media, the ever-changing tides and trends of pop music, and, quite frankly, a less than laudable collection of songs resulted in [the album] receiving a less than enthusiastic response." He also explained that it "was in no way aided by the irony-laden yet undeniable banality of the emphasis track [...], "The War Song"." However, he stated: "Two of the more interesting cuts are the vintage R&B "Crime Time" and the upbeat and soulful "Mannequin," blending Beach Boys-esque vocal harmonies with a distinctly Carolina beach and shag flavour." 

Robert Christgau rated it a B, stating: "Since I had even less use for the dismissive because-he-wears-dresses theory than for the ridiculous new-Smokey analysis, I could never figure out [Boy George's] means of commercial propulsion". He also stated that "this calls for concerted protest – which might be easier to whip up if the latest album weren't part three of more-of-the-same."

Track listing
All tracks composed by Culture Club.

Side one
 "Dangerous Man" – 4:14
 "The War Song" – 4:13
 "Unfortunate Thing" – 3:08
 "Crime Time" – 2:59
 "Mistake No. 3" – 4:36
Side two
 "The Dive" – 3:47
 "The Medal Song" – 4:15
 "Don't Talk About It" – 3:17
 "Mannequin" – 2:53
 "Hello Goodbye" – 3:25
Bonus tracks (2003 CD re-issue)
 "La Cancion de Guerra" – 4:04
 "Love Is Love" – 3:51
 "The Dream" – 2:29
 "Don't Go Down That Street" – 6:34

The Chilean cassette edition starts with an extended version of "The War Song".

Personnel
Culture Club
 Boy George – vocals
 Mikey Craig – bass guitar
 Roy Hay – guitar, piano, keyboards, sitar, electric sitar
 Jon Moss – percussion, drums
Additional musicians
 Phil Pickett – keyboards, backing vocals
 Steve Grainger – saxophone
 Kenneth McGregor – trombone
 Ron Williams – trumpet
 Helen Terry – backing vocals
 Imogen Exton – backing vocals
 Derek Green – backing vocals
 Alice Kemp – backing vocals
 Andriana Loizou – backing vocals
 Alanda Marchant – backing vocals
 Nancy Peppers – backing vocals
 Chris Rainbow – backing vocals
 Louis Rogers – backing vocals
 Martin Sunley – backing vocals
 Tara Thomas – backing vocals
 Clare Torry – backing vocals

Production
 Steve Levine – producer, digital mixing
 Gordon Milne – engineer
 Peter Lees – assistant engineer
 Jon Moss – digital mixing
 Ray Allington – hair stylist
 Kim Bowen – stylist
 Stevie Hughes – photography, makeup
 Connie Jude – cover and rear sleeve illustration

Charts

Weekly charts

Year-end charts

Certifications

Release details

References

1984 albums
Culture Club albums
Virgin Records albums
Albums produced by Steve Levine
Epic Records albums